Huang Lizhu (born 9 October 1987 in Qionghai) is a Chinese competitive sailor. She competed at the 2016 Summer Olympics in Rio de Janeiro, in the women's 470 class.

References

External links 
 
 
 
 

1987 births
Living people
Chinese female sailors (sport)
Olympic sailors of China
Sailors at the 2016 Summer Olympics – 470
Sailors at the 2014 Asian Games
Asian Games competitors for China
21st-century Chinese women